Khethokwakhe Masuku (born 8 September 1985) is a South African association football player for NB La Masia.

His clubs include Black Leopards, Orlando Pirates, Royal Eagles, Bloemfontein Celtic, Marumo Gallants and NB La Masia.

He plays midfield, mostly used in wide positions but can also play behind the striker.

References

1985 births
Living people
Sportspeople from Soweto
Black Leopards F.C. players
Orlando Pirates F.C. players
Royal Eagles F.C. players
Bloemfontein Celtic F.C. players
Marumo Gallants F.C. players
South African soccer players
South African Premier Division players
National First Division players
Association football midfielders